Japan is one of the countries frequently hit by typhoons.

Since recording started in 1951, an average of 2.6 typhoons reached the main islands of Kyushu, Shikoku, Honshu and Hokkaido per year. Approximately 10.3 typhoons approach within the 300 kilometer range near the coast of Japan. Okinawa is, due to its geographic location, most vulnerable to typhoons with an average of 7 storms per year. The most destructive was Isewan Typhoon with 5,000 casualties in the Tokai region in September 1959. In October 2004, Typhoon Tokage caused heavy rain in Kyushu and central Japan with 98 casualties. Until the 1960s the death toll was hundreds of people per typhoon. Since the 1960s improvements in construction, flood prevention, high tides detection and early warnings substantially reduced the death toll which rarely exceeds a dozen people per typhoon. Japan also has special search and rescue units to save people in distress.

Special names of typhoons by JMA 
The JMA assigns special names to typhoons that have caused significant damage so that they can be handed down to future generations.

References

External links 
Tropical Cyclone Information - Japan Meteorological Agency
Digital Typhoon - National Institute of Informatics